The Provisional Council of State (German: Provisorische Staatsrat im Koenigreich Polen) was the first government of the Kingdom of Poland, a new state created by the military authorities of Germany and Austria on some Polish lands during the First World War.

The Provisional Council was officially created on the basis of Act of November 5th (of 1916), and started meetings on 14 January 1917. The Council had 25 members; 10 from Austrian lands and 15 from German lands. Its president was Wacław Niemojowski, and its vice president was Józef Mikułowski-Pomorski. Józef Piłsudski held authority over military matters.

The Council demanded more autonomy from the occupying governments, including in education. After attempts by Austria and Germany to ensure that the Council would be but a puppet body, Piłsudski resigned from it, which led to the oath crisis in the Polish legions in July. In its aftermath, the entire Council disbanded on 25 August 1917.

It was followed by the Temporary Committee of the Provisional Council of State (Komisja Przejściowa Tymczasowej Rady Stanu) and then by the Regency Council.

Members of the Council were Józef Brudziński, Stanisław Bukowiecki, Stanisław Dzierzbicki, Ludwik Górski, Józef Higersberger, Marian Januszajtis-Żegota, Kazimierz Natanson, Józef Piłsudski, Franciszek Pius Radziwiłł, Wojciech Rostworowski, Eustachy Sapieha, Stanisław Chaniewski, Stanisław Staniszewski, Władysław Studnicki, and Artur Śliwiński.

1916 establishments in Poland
1917 disestablishments in Poland
Poland in World War I
Political history of Poland
Kingdom of Poland (1917–1918)
Provisional governments